Jorge Alberti (18 May 1912 – 1985) was an Argentine footballer. He played in 23 matches for the Argentina national football team from 1940 to 1945. He was also part of Argentina's squad for the 1941 South American Championship.

References

External links
 

1912 births
1985 deaths
Argentine footballers
Argentina international footballers
Association football defenders
Club Atlético Huracán footballers
Club Atlético Los Andes footballers